Pierluigi Ussorio (born 10 May 1967) is an Italian sports shooter. He competed in the men's 25 metre rapid fire pistol event at the 1992 Summer Olympics.

References

1967 births
Living people
Italian male sport shooters
Olympic shooters of Italy
Shooters at the 1992 Summer Olympics
Sportspeople from Naples